The 2009 USC Trojans football team (variously "Trojans" or "USC") represented the University of Southern California during the 2009 NCAA Division I FBS football season. The team played their home games at the Los Angeles Memorial Coliseum and was coached by Pete Carroll, who was in his ninth and final season at USC. They finished the season 9–4, 5–4 in Pac-10 play and won the Emerald Bowl over Boston College 24–13.

Before the season

Pre-season outlook

Recruiting class

The Trojans signed a top-5 recruiting class.

Transfers

Departures

Offseason news

Schedule

Roster
Name Yr. Ht./Wt.

Quarterback
7 Matt Barkley Fr. 6-2/230
15 Aaron Corp Jr. 6-3/200
14 Garrett Green Sr. 6-2/210
6 John Manoogian Fr. 6-1/200
16 Mitch Mustain Jr. 6-3/210

Running Back
21 Allen Bradford Jr. 5-11/235
2 C.J. Gable Jr. 6-0/200
45 Adam Goodman Sr. 6-1/240
31 Stanley Havili Jr. 6-0/225
13 Stafon Johnson Sr. 5-11/215
4 Joe McKnight Jr. 6-0/200
6 Curtis McNeal Fr. 5-8/180
34 Ahmed Mokhtar So. 6-0/210
10 D.J. Shoemate So. 6-0/220
26 Marc Tyler So. 6-0/220
36 Simione Vehikite Fr. 6-0/245

Wide Receiver
9 David Ausberry Jr. 6-4/235
83 Steve Blackhart Fr. 6-2/180
49 Robbie Boyer Fr. 6-0/185
19 Brice Butler Fr. 6-3/200
46 Sean Calcagnie Jr. 6-0/190
23 Jordan Cameron Jr. 6-5/220
80 Brandon Carswell So. 6-1/185
41 Preston Cavignac Jr. 6-0/185
1 De'Von Flournoy Fr. 6-0/180
41 J.B. Green Fr. 6-1/195
8 Ronald Johnson Jr. 6-1/185
28 Drew Ness So. 6-0/190
17 Travon Patterson Jr. 5-10/175
47 Scott Stephens Jr. 6-1/180
81 Spencer Vigoren Sr. 6-4/220
18 Damian Williams Jr. 6-1/190

Tight End
88 Blake Ayles So. 6-5/255
40 Rhett Ellison Jr. 6-5/250
82 Bryson Lloyd Fr. 6-3/225
86 Anthony McCoy Sr. 6-5/255
67 Michael Reardon So. 6-5/275
87 Ian Wandler Jr. 6-4/270
73 Steve Gatena 6-5/270

Offensive Line
71 Charles Brown Sr. 6-6/295
53 Jeff Byers Sr. 6-4/285
72 Martin Coleman So. 6-5/315
77 Kevin Graf Fr. 6-6/315
74 Zack Heberer Jr. 6-5/300
78 Khaled Holmes Fr. 6-4/305
76 Nick Howell Sr. 6-5/280
75 Matt Kalil Fr. 6-6/290
68 Butch Lewis Jr. 6-5/300
50 Abe Markowitz Fr. 6-2/280
59 John Martinez Fr. 6-3/275
64 Garrett Nolan Sr. 6-4/280
61 Kristofer O'Dowd Jr. 6-5/300
56 Alex Parsons Sr. 6-4/300
62 Chris Pousson So. 6-4/240
70 Tyron Smith So. 6-6/270
85 Cooper Stephenson Jr. 6-3/215

Defensive Line
94 Armond Armstead So. 6-5/290
16 James Boyd Fr. 6-5/230
91 Jurrell Casey So. 6-1/295
92 Hebron Fangupo Jr. 6-2/330
93 Everson Griffen Jr. 6-3/265
98 DaJohn Harris So. 6-4/285
96 Wes Horton Fr. 6-5/245
97 Malik Jackson So. 6-5/230
42 Devon Kennard Fr. 6-3/255
8 Nick Perry Fr. 6-3/240
90 Derek Simmons Jr. 6-4/285
99 Averell Spicer Sr. 6-2/295
44 Christian Tupou Jr. 6-2/280

Linebacker
43 Will Andrew Fr. 6-2/225
52 Luthur Brown Sr. 6-2/235
37 Jordan Campbell So. 5-11/230
46 Ross Cumming So. 6-1/220
59 Dan Deckas Jr. 5-10/210
54 Chris Galippo So. 6-2/255
57 Nick Garratt Sr. 6-1/235
81 Kevin Greene Fr. 6-3/235
10 Jarvis Jones Fr. 6-3/225
35 Uona Kaveinga So. 6-1/235
17 Michael Morgan Jr. 6-4/220
53 Marquis Simmons Fr. 6-0/215
6 Malcolm Smith Jr. 6-1/225

Defensive Back
30 Brian Baucham Fr. 5-11/190
1 T.J. Bryant So. 6-0/180
45 Omari Crittenden Jr. 6-0/185
38 Robert Erickson Jr. 5-11/190
25 Patrick Hall Fr. 6-1/185
22 Daniel Harper So. 5-11/185
4 Torin Harris Fr. 6-1/175
26 Will Harris Sr. 6-1/200
28 Justin Hart Sr. 6-0/175
47 Michael Helfrich Fr. 6-0/190
23 Shane Horton So. 6-1/210
27 Marshall Jones Jr. 6-0/185
2 Taylor Mays Sr. 6-3/230
19 Drew McAllister So. 6-1/200
7 T. J. McDonald Fr. 6-2/205
49 Ryan McMahon So. 6-0/200
9 Byron Moore Fr. 6-1/205
36 Josh Pinkard Sr. 6-2/210
34 Spencer Spiegel So. 5-11/175
29 Jawanza Starling Fr. 6-1/190
15 Kevin Thomas Sr. 6-1/185
24 Shareece Wright Jr. 6-0/180

Kickers/Punters
38 Jordan Congdon Sr. 5-9/180
48 Jacob Harfman Jr. 5-10/190
30 Joe Houston Jr. 5-8/170
39 Billy O'Malley Jr. 6-1/195
27 Boomer Roepke So. 5-9/180

Game summaries

San Jose State

The #4 Trojans opened their season against the lightly regarded San Jose Spartans.  Though the Spartans outscored USC 3-0 in the 1st quarter of play, the Trojans quickly recovered, scoring 56 consecutive points for a 53-point victory.

Ohio State

A crowd of 106,033, the largest in Ohio Stadium history, were in attendance as the #3 USC Trojans came to Columbus, Ohio to face the #8 Ohio State Buckeyes. Both teams showed great defense with the game close at the half tied 10–10. After a safety and a field goal, Ohio State led 15–10 with less than five minutes to go. However, Matt Barkley and the Trojans drove down the field to score a touchdown and a two-point conversion to end the game. The final score was USC 18, Ohio State 15, with the Buckeyes losing to the Trojans for the second straight year.

Freshman quarterback Matt Barkley injured his right shoulder.

1st Quarter
 11:37 USC Johnson 2-yard run for Touchdown (Congdon kick) 7–0 USC
 8:06 OSU Herron 2-yard run for Touchdown (Pettrey kick) 7–7

2nd Quarter
 14:56 OSU Pettrey 18-yard field goal 10–7 OSU
 0:00 USC Congdon 21-yard field goal 10–10

3rd Quarter
 9:03 USC High snap out of the end zone for Safety 12–10 OSU
 4:43 OSU Pettrey 22-yard field goal 15–10 OSU

4th Quarter
 1:05 USC Johnson 2-yard run for Touchdown (Barkley pass to McKnight) 18–15 USC

Washington

Quarterback Aaron Corp took over for Matt Barkley.

The Huskies became the latest Pac-10 team to upset the Trojans, only two Pacific-10 Conference teams have failed to beat USC during the Pete Carroll era: Arizona and Arizona State. Other Pac-10 teams have defeated USC at least once during this period; Oregon State did it twice, 2006 and again in 2008, as did Stanford in 2001 and 2007 (and would do so again in 2009).

1st Quarter
 12:28 USC McKnight 7-yard run for Touchdown (Congdon kick) 7–0 USC
 4:36 USC Congdon 42 yd field goal 10–0 USC
 0:11 UW Jake Locker 4yd run for Touchdown (Erik Folk kick) 10–7 USC

2nd Quarter
 4:09 UW Folk 28 yd field goal 10–10 Tied

3rd Quarter
None

4th Quarter
 9:53 UW Folk 46 yd field goal 13-10 UW
 4:07 USC Congdon 25 yd field goal 13–13 Tied
 0:03 UW Folk 22 yd field goal 16–13 UW

Washington State

California

The Trojans dominated the Bears, scoring the most points since their season opener against San Jose State.

Notre Dame

The Trojans marched into South Bend ranked #6 in the nation after a 30-3 beating of #24 Cal.  The Fighting Irish lived up to their name, staying with highly ranked USC through two quarters, only trailing by 6 points, 13-7.  In the third quarter, the Trojans started to run away with the game, outscoring Notre Dame 14-7.  Going into the fourth quarter, USC had a commanding lead, 27-14. USC scored another touchdown early in the fourth quarter to go ahead, 34-14.  It looked like Notre Dame would get beat badly by their rivals once again.  But, it wasn't to be for the Fighting Irish.  Instead of losing by double digits to the Trojans again, they rallied and found themselves down 34-27 with 1 second left at the USC 1-yard-line.  Jimmy Clauson fired an incomplete pass and USC extended their winning streak over Notre Dame to 8.  The freshman Matt Barkley attempted 29 passes, completing 19, on his way to 380 yards and 2 touchdowns.  Clauson went 24-43 with  a mere 260 yards and 2 touchdowns.  Anthony McCoy led the Trojans (5-1) in receiving yards with 5 catches for 153 yards.  Notre Dame's (4-2) leading receiver was Golden Tate with 8 catches for 117 yards.

Oregon State

Last year the #1 Trojans went to Corvallis and were upset 27–21. It was the second straight trip to Corvallis for USC that resulted in defeat. Jacquizz Rodgers ran for 187 yards on 37 carries and two touchdowns in the win last year. Oregon State was the second Pac-10 Conference school to have beaten USC twice during the Pete Carroll era in 2006 and 2008 (Stanford was first with victories in 2001 and 2007 (and would do so again in 2009).

The last time Oregon State won against USC in the Coliseum was when Dwight D. Eisenhower was the President of the United States.

USC scored first when quarterback Matt Barkley passed to Anthony McCoy for an 8-yard touchdown. The Beavers got on the scoreboard with two field goal kicks from Justin Kahut (both 48 yards). In the second quarter, Matt Barkley completed a pass to Ronald Johnson for a 22 yards touchdown. On second and goal, Barkley rushed for a 1-yard touchdown for the Trojans. Kahut kicked a 33-yard field goal for Oregon State just before the half.

In the third quarter, Sean Canfield passed to Jacquizz Rodgers for a 6-yard touchdown for the Beavers on a 3:06-drive that took 8 plays for 61 yards. The Trojans countered with a 7-play drive for 70 yards with Allen Bradford rushing for 2 yards for a touchdown. Canfield narrowed Oregon State's gap by completing a 15-yard scoring pass to Damola Adeniji. USC answered with Allen Bradford scoring a 43-yard touchdown.

Oregon State became the first team to score more than 10 points on the Trojans in their last ten home games.

Oregon

Prior to the game, USC had lost three in a row in the state of Oregon, but had won four of the last five against the Ducks.  The Trojans lost the game 47–20, which was the worst defeat suffered by USC since 1997.

1st Quarter

 8:32 USC Jordan Congdon 28 field goal 3–0 USC
 7:30 Oregon Morgan Flint 32-yard field goal 3–3 tied
 1:37 Oregon Jeremiah Masoli 3-yard run for Touchdown (Morgan Flint kick) 10–3 Oregon

2nd Quarter

 10:55 USC Matt Barkley 3-yard pass to Ronald Johnson for Touchdown (Jordan Congdon kick) 10–10 Tied
 8:39 Oregon Andre Crenshaw 1-yard run for Touchdown (Morgan Flint kick) 17–10 Oregon
 3:17 USC Matt Barkley 4-yard pass to Damian Williams for Touchdown (Jordan Congdon kick) 17–17 Tied
 1:49 Oregon Jeremiah Masoli 17-yard pass to Jamere Holland for Touchdown ( Morgan Flint kick) 24–17 Oregon

3rd Quarter

 11:58 Oregon Morgan Flint 35-yard field goal 27–17 Oregon
 8:26 USC Jordan Congdon 39 field goal 27–20 Oregon
 5:50 Oregon LaMichael James 5-yard run for Touchdown (Morgan Flint kick) 34–20 Oregon
 0:00 Oregon Kenjon Barner 3-yard run for Touchdown (Morgan Flint kick) 41–20 Oregon

4th Quarter

 8:00 Oregon Morgan Flint 22-yard field goal 44–20 Oregon
 2:05 Oregon Morgan Flint 23-yard field goal 47–20 Oregon

Arizona State

Stanford

Stanford's 55–21 victory was the highest number of points any team had scored against a USC Trojans football team in the 121-year history of Trojan football. The 34-point loss was the worst defeat USC had suffered since 1966. This was Stanford's third victory against USC in their last five games against each other at the Coliseum (Stanford winning 2001, 2007, and 2009, with USC winning in 2003 and 2005), with USC having defeated every non-Stanford opponent in the Coliseum since 2001, going 47–2 since Stanford's September 29, 2001 victory in the Coliseum.  It was the first defeat in a November game for the Trojans under Coach Pete Carroll's nine-season tenure.  For the first time in since Carroll's first season, USC lost more than two games in one season.  For the second time in three weekends, Carroll suffered the worst loss of his USC tenure (the other being the Oregon game).  This was the largest margin of victory for Stanford in a Stanford-USC game since the two teams' rivalry began in 1918. Harbaugh became the only coach in college football with a winning record against Carroll, going 2–1 in the three times the two coaches have faced each other. Stanford would eclipse the all-time point spread record it set from the 2007 Stanford vs. Southern California football game, as USC was a 41-point favorite.

UCLA

UCLA–USC rivalry game for the Victory Bell, which the Trojans retained by defeating the Bruins 28–7.  Both teams wore home jerseys, in a tradition that was restarted the previous year, with the Bruins wearing their 1966 throwback powder blue jerseys.  The final two minutes of the game proved to be interesting.  With the Trojans leading 21–7 after a touchdown with 1:30 in the fourth quarter, and having possession of the ball after UCLA turned it over on downs, Carroll instructed his quarterback to take a knee.  Rick Neuheisel then called a timeout to stop the clock. On second down, the Trojans immediately connected on a 48-yard pass play for their fourth touchdown of the game.  USC beat UCLA for the 10th time in 11 years, but the late touchdown pass stirred passions in the crosstown rivalry and lead to a benches-clearing incident.

Arizona

Arizona's defeat of the Trojans gave the Wildcats their first win over USC during the Pete Carroll era. Arizona was also the first non-Stanford team in the Pac-10 to defeat the Trojans in the Coliseum under Carroll (Stanford had defeated Carroll's teams in the Coliseum in 2001, 2007, and 2009).  Arizona State is the only Pac-10 team to never beat the Trojans during Carroll's tenure.

Boston College

This marked the first time USC played in the Emerald Bowl.  On December 26, 2009 at AT&T Park in San Francisco California, attended by 40,121; the Trojans squared off against the Boston College Eagles from the Atlantic Coast Conference.

This also marked the first time that the Trojans had played in a non-BCS bowl game in seven years.  Boston College was making its 11th straight bowl appearance. The Eagles became the first team to play in the Emerald Bowl twice, beating Colorado State 35–21 in the 2003 San Francisco Bowl (the former name of the Emerald Bowl).  This was the third meeting between the two schools and the first in a bowl game. USC had won both games in the series, a 23–17 victory in Los Angeles in 1987 and a 34–7 win in Chestnut Hill in 1988.

USC freshman quarterback Matt Barkley threw touchdown passes to Stanley Havili on the Trojans first two possessions and added a touchdown run in the fourth quarter. Barkley finished the game with a total of 350 yards passing. Of his 350 yards, Damian Williams accounted for 189 of them on 12 catches. Williams was named the game's MVP for his efforts. Boston College was led by tailback Montel Harris, who rushed for 102 yards and also added a touchdown run.

Rankings

After the season
On January 10, 2010, coach Carroll told his players that he will resign his position with the Trojans and become the new head coach of the Seattle Seahawks. Lane Kiffin, formerly with the Trojans, Oakland Raiders, and Tennessee Volunteers, was hired as the new head coach.

References

External links

USC
USC Trojans football seasons
Redbox Bowl champion seasons
USC Trojans football